Irumbu Thirai is a 1960 Indian Tamil-language film produced and directed by S. S. Vasan. The film stars Sivaji Ganesan, Vyjayanthimala, K. A. Thangavelu and B. Saroja Devi, with S. V. Ranga Rao, Pandari Bai and Vasundhara Devi in supporting roles. A remake of Vasan's own Hindi film Paigham (1959), it revolves around two brothers Manikam and Kondamuthu and their mill owner.

The soundtrack was composed by S. V. Venkatraman and the lyrics were written by Kothamangalam Subbu, Papanasam Sivan and Pattukkottai Kalyanasundaram. The editing was done by M. Umanath while the camera was handled by P. Elappa and N. C. Bala Krishna. The film was released on 14 January 1960 and ran more than 175 days in theatres.

Plot 

The story revolves around two brothers Manikam and Kondamuthu and their mill owner.

Cast

Production 
In 1959, S. S. Vasan, the proprietor of Gemini Studios, began working on a film built around capital-labour relations. The film, which was the Tamil remake of his own Hindi film Paigham, was untitled, and the creative team of Gemini could not come up with a convincing title. Vasan invited his employees to suggest a title for the under-production film, and he received an abundance of entries; one office boy submitted as many as 2500 entries. After examining one by one, Vasan chose the title Irumbu Thirai. He also hosted a reception to honour the boy who suggested the title and rewarded him with some prize money. Besides producing, Vasan also directed the film.

The female cast of Paigham – Vyjayanthimala, B. Saroja Devi and Pandari Bai – returned to star in Irumbu Thirai, while Sivaji Ganesan reprised the role originally played by Dilip Kumar. It was a "coup of sorts" for Vasan to cast Ganesan since the latter had earlier been rejected by the former for a role in Chandralekha (1948), an incident which created a permanent rift between them. Vyjayanthimala's mother Vasundhara Devi played her screen mother as well, having done the same in Paigham. The final length of the film was 18396 feet.

Themes 
Irumbu Thirai focuses on capital-labour relations, and the conditions of working-class people.

Soundtrack 
The soundtrack was composed by S. V. Venkatraman. The album had Kothamangalam Subbu, Papanasam Sivan and Pattukkottai Kalyanasundaram as the lyricists. The song "Nenjil Kudiyirukkum" is set in the carnatic raga known as Shanmukhapriya, while the classical-themed "Enna Seidhaalum" is set in Kharaharapriya.

Release and reception 
Irumbu Thirai was released on 14 January 1960. Kanthan of Kalki wrote . The film was a commercial success, running for over 175 days in theatres and thereby becoming silver jubilee film.

References

Bibliography

External links 
 

1960 films
1960s Tamil-language films
Films directed by S. S. Vasan
Films scored by S. V. Venkatraman
Films with screenplays by Kothamangalam Subbu
Gemini Studios films
Tamil remakes of Hindi films